William Thaw Sr. (October 12, 1818 – August 17, 1889) was an American businessman who made his fortune in transportation and banking.

Early life
He was born in Pittsburgh, Pennsylvania, on October 12, 1818, to John Thaw and his wife Elizabeth Thomas.

Career
He worked as a clerk in his father's United States Bank of Philadelphia in Pittsburgh. He later switched to McKee, Clark and Co.

By 1842, he and his brother-in-law Thomas Shields Clarke owned steam canal boats, particularly the Pennsylvania and Ohio Canal. Their company added canal, portage railroad and other steamboat lines.

With the rise of the railroad, Thaw divested the canal business and invested in the new Pennsylvania Company, which managed interests of the Pennsylvania Railroad, in which he was a large shareholder.

Philanthropy
Thaw endowed science fellowships at Harvard University and Princeton University and bestowed lavish gifts on art and education. He underwrote the building of the Allegheny Observatory for John Brashear, considered at the time one of the ten best in the world.

Personal life

In 1841, William Thaw married Eliza Burd Blair (1822–1863). They had five children that survived childhood:

 Eliza Thaw (1843–1912), who married George Breed Edwards (1842–1887)
 William Thaw Jr. (1853–1892), who married Elizabeth Dohrman (1854–1948) 
 Mary Thaw (1856–1944), who in 1879 married William Reed Thompson (1845–1906)
 Benjamin Thaw Sr. (1859–1933), who married Elma Ellsworth Dows (1861–1931)
 Alexander Blair Thaw (1860–1937), who in 1886 married Florence Dow (1864–1940)

In 1867, after the death of his first wife, he married Mary Sibbet Copley (1843–1929). They had five children that survived childhood:

 Harry Kendall Thaw (1871–1947), who would later shoot and kill the prominent architect Stanford White in front of hundreds of witnesses and be ruled insane and confined to a mental institution In his will, he left $10,000, less than 1% of his fortune, to his estranged wife, the film actress and former model Evelyn Nesbit.
 Edward Thaw (1873–1924), who married Jane Olmsted (1880–1958)
 Josiah Copley Thaw (1874–1944), who in 1903 married Mary Harrington Thomson (1881–1947)
 Margaret Copley Thaw (1877–1942), who first married George Lauder Carnegie (1876–1921), nephew of Andrew Carnegie.  After his death, she married Roger, Comte de Périgny and became Countess de Périgny.
 Alice Cornelia Thaw (1880–1955), who married George Seymour, 7th Marquess of Hertford (1871–1940). They divorced and she married Geoffrey George Whitney Sr. in 1913.

In 1887, he commissioned architect Theophilus P. Chandler Jr. to build him a home. Lyndhurst, completed in 1889 and demolished around 1942, was located at 1165 Beechwood Boulevard in the Squirrel Hill neighborhood of Pittsburgh.

Thaw died in Paris on August 17, 1889.

Legacy
He is considered to have been one of the 100 wealthiest Americans, having left an enormous fortune. He was the father of Harry Kendall Thaw, whose 1906 killing of noted architect Stanford White resulted in a sensational "trial of the century" and aftermath.

A small town in East Central Illinois is named Thawville in honor of William Thaw Sr.  William K. Thaw owned a controlling interest in the GCS and Thawville was platted in November 1871.  The GCS went into receivership during the panic of 1873 and was later taken over by the Illinois Central Company.  William K. Thaw visited the town only once—in February 1874 or 1875.  At that time he was snowbound in town for two or three days.  Taylor John owned the land now included in Thawville as far east as Wood St. and as far north as County Road (State Aid Road).  Although an attempt to incorporate Thawville failed in 1897, another attempt was successful in 1903. The town is still there.

A plaque is on the front 304 Wood Street in Downtown Pittsburgh, commemorating his birthplace.

References

External links
 Biography of William Thaw
Historic Pittsburgh
Guide to Thaw, William. Letter, July 23, 1877. 5170m. Kheel Center for Labor-Management Documentation and Archives, Martin P. Catherwood Library, Cornell University.

1818 births
1889 deaths
Harvard University people
Businesspeople from Pittsburgh
Burials at Allegheny Cemetery
19th-century American businesspeople